Hugo Karl Ferdinand Reiman (9 January 1887 Tartu – 13 January 1957 Tallinn) was an Estonian statistician and politician. He was a member of the Estonian Provincial Assembly. On 26 November 1918, he resigned his position and he was replaced by Aleksander Oinas.

References

1887 births
1957 deaths
Politicians from Tartu
Writers from Tartu
people from Kreis Dorpat
Estonian Socialist Revolutionary Party politicians
Members of the Estonian Provincial Assembly
Estonian statisticians
Estonian male writers
20th-century Estonian writers
Estonian non-fiction writers
Male non-fiction writers
Burials at Liiva Cemetery